The RT2 is a line of Rodalies de Catalunya's Tarragona commuter rail service, operated by Renfe Operadora. It links Port Aventura railway station in the Costa Daurada area with L'Arboç railway station, in Baix Penedès, through the city of Tarragona.

It became the first commuter service to use the Valencia-Sant Vicenç de Calders railway, originally designed to serve regional as well as inter-city rail. On 13 January 2020, the RT2 was shortened, so that it began to operate in its current configuration. This shortening came up as a result of the opening of a new inland line between Tarragona and L'Ametlla de Mar, and the closure of the coastal line beyond Port Aventura.

List of stations
The following table lists the name of each station served by line RT2 in order from west to east; the station's service pattern offered by RT2 trains; the transfers to other Rodalies de Catalunya lines, including both commuter and regional rail services; remarkable transfers to other transport systems; the municipality in which each station is located; and the fare zone each station belongs to according to the Autoritat del Transport Metropolità (ATM Àrea de Barcelona) fare-integrated public transport system and Rodalies de Catalunya's own fare zone system for Barcelona commuter rail service lines.

References

External links
 Rodalies de Catalunya official website
 Schedule for the RT2 (PDF format)
 RT2 Rodalies (rodt2cat) on Twitter. Official Twitter account by Rodalies de Catalunya for the RG2 with service status updates (tweets usually published only in Catalan)
 
 RT2 (rodalia T2) on Twitter. Unofficial Twitter account by Rodalia.info monitoring real-time information about the RT2 by its users.
 Information about the R7 at trenscat.cat 

T2
Railway services introduced in 2014